The Maritime News Agency (MANA) is a private news agency in Iran that launched in 2004. Its purpose is to cover a variety of marine, shipping, tourism and navy news along with other fields related to the industry.

Profile
The website states it is the sole news wire service to cover marine news in the Iran. The news agency has given large coverage to events such as shipping and Persian Gulf news, as well as the Caspian Sea. 

MANA's main headquarters for news is based in Iran's capital Tehran, with reporters across the country and region. The news agency covers such news as the Islamic Republic of Iran Shipping Line stories and global shipping stories.

MANA English news
The English department of MANA is staffed with English and Persian dual language speakers. It provides readers with English versions of articles, news, photos, videos and analyses produced in the Persian department, but not necessarily every piece of the Persian products.

References

2004 establishments in Iran
Government agencies established in 2004
News agencies based in Iran
Multilingual news services
Mass media in Tehran